Acrylyl-CoA reductase (NADH) is an enzyme with systematic name propanoyl-CoA:NAD+ oxidoreductase. This enzyme catalyses the following chemical reaction

 propanoyl-CoA + NAD+  acryloyl-CoA + NADH + H+

The reaction is catalysed in the opposite direction.

References

External links 
 

EC 1.3.1